The Bangladesh national cricket team toured the West Indies from May to June 2004 to play two Test matches and three Limited Overs Internationals.

Squads

One Day Internationals (ODIs)

1st ODI

2nd ODI

3rd ODI

Test series summary

1st Test

2nd Test

References

2004 in Bangladeshi cricket
2004
International cricket competitions in 2004
2003–04 West Indian cricket season
2004 in West Indian cricket